An anopsia is a defect in the visual field. If the defect is only partial, then the portion of the field with the defect can be used to isolate the underlying cause.

Types of partial anopsia:

Hemianopsia
Homonymous hemianopsia
Heteronymous hemianopsia
Binasal hemianopsia
Bitemporal hemianopsia
Superior hemianopia
Inferior hemianopia
Quadrantanopia

References

External links 

Visual disturbances and blindness